Norman Percy Drake (7 July 1912 – 16 November 1972) was a British athlete.

Athletics career
He competed in the men's hammer throw at the 1936 Summer Olympics and the 1948 Summer Olympics.

He represented England at the 1934 British Empire Games in the hammer throw and 16 years later was part of the England team at the 1950 British Empire Games in Auckland, New Zealand, where he competed in the hammer and shot put.

References

1912 births
1972 deaths
Athletes (track and field) at the 1936 Summer Olympics
Athletes (track and field) at the 1948 Summer Olympics
British male hammer throwers
Olympic athletes of Great Britain
Sportspeople from Retford
Athletes (track and field) at the 1934 British Empire Games
Athletes (track and field) at the 1950 British Empire Games
Commonwealth Games competitors for England